Busanwondong station (Hangul: 부산원동역; Hanja: 釜山院洞驛) is a railway station of the Donghae Line between Allak-dong, Dongnae District and Banyeo-dong, Haeundae District, Busan, South Korea. The station is unrelated to the Wondong station of Gyeongbu Railway. The groundbreaking ceremony was held on August 8, 2017 and was opened on March 28, 2020.

References

Haeundae District
Korail stations
Railway stations in Busan
2017 establishments in South Korea
Railway stations opened in 2020